Fantasize Your Ghost is the second studio album by American band Ohmme. It was released on June 5, 2020 under Joyful Noise Recordings.

Background
Band members Sima Cunningham and Macie Stewart produced the album with musician Chris Cohen in Wisconsin in August 2019.

Tour
In May 2020, the band announced a tour of North American for January 2021.

Singles
On March 5, 2020, Ohmme announced the release of the album along with the first single "3 2 4 3".

Critical reception
Fantasize Your Ghosts was met with "universal acclaim" reviews from critics. At Metacritic, which assigns a weighted average rating out of 100 to reviews from mainstream publications, this release received an average score of 83, based on 11 reviews. Aggregator Album of the Year gave the album a 79 out of 100 based on 11 reviews.

Track listing

References

2020 albums
Joyful Noise Recordings albums
Ohmme albums